The 32nd Pan American Judo Championships were held in Miami, United States from 8 May to 10 May 2008.

Medal overview

Men's events

Women's events

Medals table

External links
 
 USA Judo

American Championships
Judo
2008
Pan American Judo
Judo competitions in the United States
International sports competitions hosted by the United States